Behavioral activation (BA) is a third generation behavior therapy for treating depression. It is one form of functional analytic psychotherapy, which is based on a Skinnerian psychological model of behavior change, generally referred to as applied behavior analysis. This area is also a part of what is called clinical behavior analysis (CBA) and makes up one of the most effective practices in the professional practice of behavior analysis. The technique can also be used from a cognitive-behavior therapy framework.

Overview
The Beck Institute describes BA as "getting clients more active and involved in life by scheduling activities that have the potential to improve their mood."

Theoretical underpinnings
Behavioral activation emerged from a component analysis of cognitive behavioral therapy. This analysis found that any cognitive component added little to the overall treatment of depression. The behavioral component had existed as a stand-alone treatment in the early work of Peter Lewinsohn and thus a group of behaviorists decided that it might be more efficient to pursue a purer behavioral treatment for the disorder. The theory holds that not enough environmental reinforcement or too much environmental punishment can contribute to depression. The goal of the intervention is to increase environmental reinforcement and reduce punishment.

The theoretical underpinnings of behavioral activation for depression is Charles Ferster's functional analysis of depression. Ferster's basic model has been strengthened by further development in the study of reinforcement principles which led to the matching law and continuing theoretical advances in the possible functions of depression, as well as a look at behavior analysis of child development in order to determine long-term patterns which may lead to dysthymia.

Methods
One behavioral activation (BA) approach to depression was as follows: participants were asked to create a hierarchy of reinforcing activities which were then rank-ordered by difficulty; participants tracked their own goals along with clinicians who used a token economy to reinforce success in moving through the hierarchy of activities; participants were measured before and after by the Beck Depression Inventory (BDI) and a great effect on their depression was found as a result of their treatment. This was then compared to a control group who did not receive the same treatment. The results of those who received behavioral activation treatment were markedly superior to those of the persons in the control group. Multiple clinics have since piloted and developed the treatment.

Another behavioral activation approach utilized a different methodology: clients are asked to develop an understanding of the relationship between actions and emotions, with actions being seen as the cause of emotions. An hourly self-monitoring chart is created to track activities and the impact on the mood they create for a full week. A rating scale from 1 to 10 is used for each mood change per hour. The goal is to identify depression loops. A depression loop is when a temporary coping method reduces the overall depression, such as the temporary relief provided by alcohol or other drugs, escape or avoidance or rumination. When patterns of dysfunctional responding, or loops, are identified alternative coping responses are attempted to break the loop. This method is described with the acronym "TRAP" (Trigger, Response, Avoidance Pattern) which is to be replaced with a "TRAC" (Trigger, Response, Alternate Coping response). Particular attention is given to rumination, which is provided with its own acronym RCA (Rumination Cues Action). Rumination is identified as a particularly common avoidance behavior which worsens mood. The client is to evaluate the rumination in terms of it having improved the thing being ruminated about, providing understanding, and its emotional effects on the client. Attending to experience is suggested as an alternative to rumination as well as other possible distracting or mood improving actions.

The general program is described with the acronym ACTION (Assess behavior/mood, Choose alternate responses, Try out those alternate responses, Integrate these alternatives, Observe results and (Now) evaluate). The goal being the understanding of the relationship between actions and emotional consequences and a systematic replacement of dysfunctional patterns with adaptive ones. Additionally, focus is given to quality sleep, and improving social functioning.

Research support

Depression
Reviews of behavioral activation studies for depression found that it has a robust effect and that policy makers should consider it an effective treatment. A large-scale treatment study found behavioral activation to be more effective than cognitive therapy and on par with medication for treating depression. A meta-analysis study comprising 34 Randomized Controlled Trials found that while Behavioral Activation treatment of adults with depression showed significantly greater beneficial effect compared with control participants, compared to participants treated with CT/CBT, at post treatment there were no statistically significant differences between treatment groups. Another meta-analysis comprising 25 Randomized Controlled Trials found a large effect size for behavioral activation compared to controls at post-treatment. A 2009 meta-analysis showed a medium post-treatment effect size compared to psychotherapy and other treatments.

Anxiety
A 2006 study of behavioral activation being applied to anxiety appeared to give promising results. One study found it to be effective with fibromyalgia-related pain anxiety.

In the context of third generation behavior therapies
Behavioral activation comes under the heading clinical behavior analysis or what is often termed third generation behavior therapy. Other behavior therapies are acceptance and commitment therapy (ACT), as well as dialectical behavior therapy (DBT) and functional analytic psychotherapy (FAP). Behavioral activation owes its basis to Charles Ferster's Functional Analysis of Depression (1973) which developed B.F. Skinner's idea of depression, within his analysis of motivation, as a lack of reinforcement.

Professional organizations
The Association for Behavior Analysis International has a special interest group for practitioner issues, behavioral counseling, and clinical behavior analysis. The association has larger special interest groups for behavioral medicine. It also serves as the core intellectual home for behavior analysts.

The Association for Behavioral and Cognitive Therapies (ABCT) also has an interest group in behavior analysis, which focuses on clinical behavior analysis.

Doctoral level behavior analysts who are psychologists belong to the American Psychological Association's division 25—Behavior analysis. APA offers a diplomate in behavioral psychology.

BA in Virtual Reality 
Due to a lack of access to trained providers, physical constraints or financial reasons, many patients are not able to attend BA therapy. Researchers are trying to overcome these challenges by providing BA via Virtual Reality. The idea of the concept is to enable especially elderly adults to participate in engaging activities that they would not attend it without VR. Possibly, the so-called "BA-inspired VR protocols" will mitigate the lower mood, life satisfaction, and likelihood of depressions.

References 

Behavior therapy
Behavior modification
Cognitive behavioral therapy
Depression (mood)